Yandian Township is a township under the administration of Wafangdian City in southern Liaoning province, China, located about  northwest of downtown Wafangdian,  north of Dalian, and served directly by China National Highway 202. , it has 7 villages under its administration.

See also 
 List of township-level divisions of Liaoning

References 

Townships of Liaoning
Wafangdian